Fahd bin Abdul Rahman Balghunaim (born 27 March 1952) is a Saudi engineer. He served as the minister of agriculture between May 2003 and December 2014.

Early life and education
Balghunaim was born on 27 March 1952. He obtained a bachelor of science degree in civil engineering from King Fahd University of Petroleum and Minerals in 1975 and a master's degree in construction, engineering and management from Stanford University in 1978. He also received a PhD in transportation engineering from the University of Michigan in 1984.

Career
From 1975 to 1990 Balghunaim worked as an academic first at King Fahd University of Petroleum and Minerals and then at King Saud University. He served as the deputy agriculture minister responsible for fisheries for one year (1990-1991). Then he was named as governor of the Saline Water Conversion Corporation (SWCC) in 1991. His tenure lasted until 2001. He became a member of the Shoura Council in 2001. He served as a member of the services, public facilities and environment committee in the council until 2003.

Balghunaim was appointed minister of agriculture in May 2003 and served in the post until 8 December 2014 when Walid bin Abdulkarim Al Khuraiji replaced him in the post.

From 2015 Balghunaim became the chairman of AAW and Partners Consulting Engineer and of Tarsheed Company for Agricultural Development and Investment.

References

External links

Fahd
Fahd
Fahd
Fahd
Fahd
1952 births
Agriculture ministers of Saudi Arabia
King Fahd University of Petroleum and Minerals alumni
Academic staff of King Fahd University of Petroleum and Minerals
Academic staff of King Saud University
Living people
Members of the Consultative Assembly of Saudi Arabia
Stanford University School of Engineering alumni
University of Michigan College of Engineering alumni
Saudi Arabian civil engineers